Jayden Sullivan (born 16 September 2001) is a professional rugby league footballer who plays as a halfback, five-eighth or hooker for the St. George Illawarra Dragons in the NRL (National Rugby League).

Background
Sullivan was born in Wollongong, New South Wales, of Macedonian and Indigenous Australian background.

Career

Early career 
Sullivan played his junior rugby league at Western Suburbs Red Devils in Illawarra Rugby League.

In 2019, he was selected for the New South Wales Under-18's team after an impressive year where he won the 2019 S. G. Ball Cup with the Illawarra Steelers as captain.

2020 
Sullivan made his debut for St. George Illawarra against Melbourne in round 20 of the 2020 NRL season.

2021
Sullivan made five appearances for St. George Illawarra in the 2021 NRL season as the club missed out on the finals by finishing 11th on the table.

2022
Sullivan played nine games for St. George Illawarra in the 2022 NRL season as the club finished 10th on the table and missed the finals.

Statistics

References

External links 

 Dragons profile

2001 births
Living people
Australian rugby league players
Indigenous Australian rugby league players
Rugby league players from Wollongong
Rugby league five-eighths
St. George Illawarra Dragons players